Glaphyria bilinealis is a moth in the family Crambidae. It is found in Cuba, Jamaica, Puerto Rico and on the Virgin Islands.

References

Moths described in 1794
Glaphyriini